Elina Avanesyan was the defending champion but chose not to participate.

Linda Nosková won the title, defeating Ysaline Bonaventure in the final, 6–1, 6–3.

Seeds

Draw

Finals

Top half

Bottom half

References

External Links
Main Draw

Reinert Open - Singles